"Turning Japanese" is a song by English band the Vapors, from their 1980 album New Clear Days. It was an international hit, becoming the band's most well-known song. The song prominently features an Oriental riff played on guitar.

Composition and recording
According to songwriter David Fenton, "Turning Japanese is all the clichés about angst and youth and turning into something you didn't expect to." Fenton intended the song to be a love song, with the character of the song "pining over a photograph of his ex-girlfriend" in his bedroom, drawing from Fenton's own experience of being rejected. Fenton wrote the song in his flat, but had problem writing the chorus.  He said that the chorus then came to him suddenly when he woke up at 4am with the line "Turning Japanese, I think I'm turning Japanese" in his head, but the words and the song title did not "really mean much".

The song was produced by Vic Coppersmith-Heaven, who had previously rejected a request to produce for the band after listening to demos send to him by the band's managers John Weller (father of Paul Weller) and Bruce Foxton. The band's unsuccessful first single "Prisoners" was therefore produced by someone else. He later had another listen to the demos and agreed to produce "Turning Japanese" for them. Coppersmith-Heaven proposed several changes to the arrangement of the song, so the finished recording has a different arrangement from the demo. He recorded the Vapors live to capture the energy of the band, before stripping it down to just the drums, and then overdubbed the song. According to Fenton, the drummer did not like the song, and "just went "Boom! Splat!"" in the recording, but the band thought it sounded good and kept it.

The band suspected they would score a hit with "Turning Japanese", even delaying its release in order to make it their second single, hoping to avoid becoming "one-hit wonders". Nonetheless, they never matched the single's success. In Australia, it spent two weeks at No. 1 during June 1980, and, coincidentally, the song was also a minor hit in Japan.

The music video was directed by Russell Mulcahy.

Covers
Kirsten Dunst recorded a cover, with an accompanying video filmed directed by McG and produced by Takashi Murakami in Tokyo in August 2009.

The song was featured on the soundtrack of the 1997 movie Beverly Hills Ninja covered by the band The Hazies.

On the Canadian sketch comedy series Second City Television, Rick Moranis performed a lounge-style version of the song as the character Tom Monroe.

The American ska punk band, Skankin' Pickle, covered the song on their 1994 album Sing Along With Skankin' Pickle.

Charts

Weekly charts

Year-end charts

Certifications and sales

See also
List of number-one singles in Australia during the 1980s

References

External links

1980 songs
1980 singles
The Vapors songs
United Artists Records singles
Music videos directed by Russell Mulcahy
Number-one singles in Australia
Song recordings produced by Vic Coppersmith-Heaven
Japan in non-Japanese culture